General Cepeda is one of the 38 municipalities of Coahuila, in north-eastern Mexico. The municipal seat lies at General Cepeda. The municipality covers an area of 3517 km².

As of 2005, the municipality had a total population of 11,284.

References

Municipalities of Coahuila